Auguste Carli was born on July 12, 1868 in Marseille, Bouches-du-Rhône, and many of his works can be seen in Marseille itself and in the Bouches-du-Rhône and Gard regions. This list attempts to cover his recorded works.

Works

War Memorials

Miscellaneous

The cemetery here has several sculptures by Auguste Carli.

References

Carli